The Louisiana Ragin' Cajuns college football team represents the University of Louisiana at Lafayette in the Sun Belt Conference. The Ragin' Cajuns compete as part of the NCAA Division I Football Bowl Subdivision. The program has had 27 head coaches since it began play during the 1901 season. Since December 2021, Michael Desormeaux has served as head coach at Louisiana.

Five coaches have led Northwestern in postseason bowl games: Louis Whitman, Russ Faulkinberry, Mark Hudspeth, Billy Napier, and Desormeaux. Seven of those coaches also won conference championships: Johnny Cain and Louis Whitman each captured one as a member of the Louisiana Intercollegiate Conference; Faulkinberry captured three and Raymond Didier one as a member of the Gulf States Conference; Nelson Stokley captured two as a member of the Big West Conference; and Napier captured two and Rickey Bustle one as a member of the Sun Belt Conference.

Faulkinberry and Stokley are the leaders in seasons coached with 13 years as head coach. Faulkinberry is the leader in overall wins with 66, and Napier has the highest winning percentage of those who coached more than three games at 0.769. Jerry Baldwin has the lowest winning percentage at 0.182. Of the 27 different head coaches who have led the Cajuns, Cain has been inducted into the College Football Hall of Fame.

Key

Coaches

Notes

References

Louisiana

Louisiana Ragin' Cajuns head football coaches